An epistle (epistolē, "letter") is a writing directed or sent to a person or group of people, usually an elegant and formal didactic letter.  The epistle genre of letter-writing was common in ancient Egypt as part of the scribal-school writing curriculum. The letters in the New Testament from Apostles to Christians are usually referred to as epistles. Those traditionally attributed to Paul are known as Pauline epistles and the others as catholic (i.e., "general") epistles.

Ancient Egyptian epistles
The ancient Egyptians wrote epistles, most often for pedagogical reasons. Egyptologist Edward Wente (1990) speculates that the Fifth-dynasty Pharaoh Djedkare Isesi—in his many letters sent to his viziers—was a pioneer in the epistolary genre. Its existence is firmly attested during the Sixth Dynasty of the Old Kingdom, and is prominently featured in the educational guide The Book of Kemit written during the Eleventh Dynasty. A standardized formulae for epistolary compositions existed by the time of the Middle Kingdom of Egypt. The epistolary formulae used in the Ramesside Period found its roots in the letters composed during the Amarna Period of the Twentieth Dynasty. Wente describes the "Satirical Letter" found on the Papyrus Anastasi I of the Nineteenth Dynasty as an epistle which was commonly copied as a writing exercise by Egyptian schoolchildren on ceramic ostraca (over eighty examples of which have been found so far by archaeologists). Epistle letters were also written to the dead, and, by the Ramesside Period, to the gods; the latter became even more widespread during the eras of Persian and Greek domination.

Ancient Greece and Rome

Epistles in prose and verse were a major genre of literature among the Greeks and particularly the Romans. The letters of Cicero are one of the most important sources on the history of the late Roman Republic and preserve features of colloquial Latin not always in evidence in his speeches and treatises. The letters of Pliny the Younger likewise are studied as both examples of Latin prose with self-conscious literary qualities and sources for historical information. Ovid produced three collections of verse epistles, composed in elegiac couplets: the Heroides, letters written in the person of legendary women to their absent lovers; and the Tristia and Ex Ponto, written in first person during the poet's exile. The epistles of Seneca, with their moral or philosophical ruminations, influenced later patristic writers.

Form of Christian epistles
Christian epistles, both those in the New Testament and among the early Christian Fathers, were written in accordance with the formalized, Hellenistic tradition. This reflects the amount of Hellenistic influence upon the epistle writers, especially in the case of Paul. Classicist Steve Reece has compared thousands of Greek, Roman, and Jewish letters contemporary with Paul and observes that Paul follows many of the normal epistolary conventions.

Opening/greetings
In contrast to modern letters, epistles usually named the author at the very beginning, followed by the recipient (for example, see Philippians 1:1). The scribe (or more correctly, the amanuensis) who wrote down the letter may be named at the end of the epistle (e.g., Romans 16:22). In the absence of a postal system, the courier may also be named (e.g. Ephesians 6:21–22).

After the names of the author and recipient, Pauline epistles often open with the greeting, "Grace and peace to you." "Grace" was a common Hellenistic greeting, while "peace" (shalom) was the common Jewish greeting; this reflected Paul's dual identity in Jewish faith and Hellenistic culture. There may also be a word of thanks to the audience. In secular letters, a prayer or wish for health followed.

Content/body 
The body begins with a brief statement introducing the main topic of the entire body.

New Testament epistles
The epistles of the New Testament canon are usually divided as follows:

Pauline epistles

The Pauline epistles, also called Epistles of Paul or Letters of Paul, are the thirteen books of the New Testament attributed to Paul the Apostle, although the authorship of some is in dispute. Among these epistles are some of the earliest extant Christian documents. They provide an insight into the beliefs and controversies of early Christianity. As part of the canon of the New Testament, they are foundational texts for both Christian theology and ethics. The Epistle to the Hebrews, although it does not bear his name, was traditionally considered Pauline (although Origen questioned its authorship in the 3rd century CE), but from the 16th century onwards opinion steadily moved against Pauline authorship and few scholars now ascribe it to Paul, mostly because it does not read like any of his other epistles in style and content. Most scholars agree that Paul actually wrote seven of the Pauline epistles, but that four of the epistles in Paul's name are pseudepigraphic (Ephesians, First Timothy, Second Timothy, and Titus) and that two other epistles are of questionable authorship (Second Thessalonians and Colossians). According to some scholars, Paul wrote these letters with the help of a secretary, or amanuensis, who would have influenced their style, if not their theological content.

The Pauline epistles are usually placed between the Acts of the Apostles and the Catholic epistles in modern editions. Most Greek manuscripts, however, place the General epistles first, and a few minuscules (175, 325, 336, and 1424) place the Pauline epistles at the end of the New Testament.

Catholic (i.e., "general") epistles

The catholic epistles (also called the general epistles) are seven epistles of the New Testament. Listed in order of their appearance in the New Testament, the catholic epistles are:

Non canonical epistles
 Correspondence of Paul and Seneca, a set of 14 letters also known as the Epistle to Seneca the Younger
 Third Epistle to the Corinthians (canonical for a time in the Armenian Orthodox), also a correspondence of two letters
 Epistle to the Laodiceans (Latin version found in Codex Fuldensis)
 Letter of Peter to Philip

Lost epistles
 The first Epistle to Corinth referenced at 
 The Corinthian letter to Paul referenced at 
 The Earlier Epistle to the Ephesians referenced at 
 The Epistle to the Laodiceans referenced at 
 The Earlier Epistle of Jude referenced at 
 The Earlier Epistle of John referenced at

Epistles of Apostolic Fathers 
These are letters written by some very early Christian leaders, in the 1st or 2nd century, which are not part of the New Testament. They are generally considered to form part of the basis of Christian tradition. The ennobling word "epistle" is used partly because these were all written in Greek, in a time period close to when the epistles of the New Testament were written, and thus "epistle" lends additional weight of authority.

 Epistle of the Romans to the Corinthians (1 Clement)
 Epistle of Ignatius to the Ephesians 
 Epistle of Ignatius to the Magnesians 
 Epistle of Ignatius to the Trallians
 Epistle of Ignatius to the Romans 
 Epistle of Ignatius to the Philadelphians 
 Epistle of Ignatius to the Smyrnaeans 
 Epistle of Ignatius to Polycarp 
 Epistle of Polycarp to the Philippians
 Epistle of Barnabas 
 Epistle to Diognetus

Liturgical use

In the context of a liturgy, epistle may refer more specifically to a particular passage from a New Testament epistle (the Pauline epistles and the General epistles)—sometimes also from the Book of Acts or the Revelation of John, but not the Four Gospels—that is scheduled to be read on a certain day or at a certain occasion.

Western churches
In the Roman Catholic Mass and Anglican Eucharist, epistles are read between the Collect and the Gospel reading. The corresponding Gregorian chants have a special tone (tonus epistolae). When the epistle is sung or chanted at Solemn Mass it is done so by the subdeacon. Epistles are also read by an Elder or Bishop in the Lutheran Divine Service, between the gradual and the Gospel.

Eastern churches

In the Divine Liturgy of the Eastern Orthodox Church and the Byzantine Rite Catholics the Epistle reading is called the Apostol (the same name is given to the lectionary from which it is read). The Apostol includes the Acts of the Apostles as well as the Epistles, but never the Apocalypse (Revelation of John).  Unlike the Latin Rite there are never readings from the Old Testament. There are Epistle lessons for every day of the year, except for weekdays during Great Lent, when the Divine Liturgy is not celebrated. These daily Epistle readings are a part of the Paschal cycle, being ultimately dependent upon the date of Pascha (Easter). There are also lessons appointed for the feast days of numerous saints and commemorations. There may be one, two, or three readings from the Apostol during a single Liturgy. The Epistle is read between the Prokeimenon and the Alleluia. The Epistle reading is always linked to a reading from the Gospel, though some services, such as Matins, will have a Gospel lesson, but no Epistle (Vespers on a number of feast days (typically for Apostles) will also have three epistle readings but no Gospel). A number of services besides the Divine Liturgy will have an Epistle and Gospel reading. Such services often include a Prokeimenon and Alleluia as well. The Epistle is chanted by the reader, though at a Hierarchical Liturgy (a Divine Liturgy celebrated by a bishop), it is read by a deacon. The one who chants the Epistle also reads the verses of the Prokeimenon.

Medieval epistles
During the Middle Ages, the art of letter writing was taught in numerous manuals, and the ars dictaminis became an important genre of instructional discourse. The necessity for letter writing was in large part due to the general deterioration of civil life and the decay of the Roman road system in the early Middle Ages, factors that obliged literate people with business to transact to send letters instead of travel themselves. A vast number of letters and letter-writing manuals were written in the period's lingua franca, Latin.

See also 
 Acts of the Apostles (genre)
 Agrapha
 Authorship of the Bible
 Epistle (Quaker)
 Epistolography
 Epistolary novel, a novel written as a series of letters or similar writings
 Epistolary poem
 Letter collection
 New Testament apocrypha
 Pseudepigraphy
 Textual criticism
 Shikshapatri

Notes

External links

 
 Catholic Encyclopedia: Epistles
 David Trobisch, "How to read an ancient letter collection", 1999: the possibility of a narrative critical study of the Letters of Paul

3rd-millennium BC introductions
Ancient Egyptian literature
 
Christian genres
Fifth Dynasty of Egypt
Letters (message)
Literature
Pedagogy